Kill the Architect is the fourth solo studio album by American rapper Cage. It was released by Eastern Conference Records and KGMG on October 22, 2013. It peaked at number 46 on the Billboard Top R&B/Hip-Hop Albums chart.

Track listing

Personnel
Credits adapted from liner notes.

 Cage – vocals
 DJ Mighty Mi – production (1, 3, 4, 5, 7, 8, 9, 10, 11, 12, 13)
 Slugworth – production (1, 3, 4, 5, 7, 8, 9, 10, 11, 12, 13)
 Mr. Bomb Camp – production (2, 6)
 Aaron Perez – production (4)

Charts

References

External links
 
 

2013 albums
Cage (rapper) albums
Eastern Conference Records albums